Funerary art in Puritan New England encompasses graveyard headstones carved between c. 1640 and the late 18th century by the Puritans, founders of the first American colonies, and their descendants. Early New England puritan funerary art conveys a practical attitude towards 17th-century mortality; death was an ever-present reality of life, and their funerary traditions and grave art provide a unique insight into their views on death. The minimalist artistry of the early headstone designs reflect a religious doctrine, which largely avoided unnecessary decoration or embellishment.

The earliest Puritan graves in the New England states of Maine, Vermont, New Hampshire, Massachusetts, Connecticut and Rhode Island, were usually dug without planning in designated local burial grounds, and sometimes marked with upright slate, sandstone or granite stones containing factual but inelegant inscriptions. Subsequent generations decorated their stone headstones with carvings; most dramatically with depictions of death's head, a stylized skull sometimes with wings or crossed bones.

Later examples show the deceased carried by the wings, supposedly taking their soul to heaven. From the 1690s the imagery becomes less severe, and began to include winged cherubs (known as "soul effigies") who had fuller faces and rounder and more life-sized eyes and mouths. In headstones dating from the Federalist Era, the rise of secularism saw the prominence of urn and willow imagery.

Stonecarvers

The craftsmen and woman who first designed and built the early headstones were generalists tradesmen who also worked as smiths, leather-workers or printers. They tended to work locally; there are no known journeyman or itinerant carvers producing across a wide geographical area. A significant number of surviving headstones share a decorative traditions, which some variation between regions. The oldest known full time grave carver in the Colonies was George Griswold (1633-1704) of Windsor, Connecticut who was carving markers from the 1640s until the 1690s. The oldest surviving example of Griswold's work is an enclosed table type marker dated 1644 for the Reverend Ephraim Huit of the First Church of Windsor. The Boston region was increasing in population rapidly in the mid to late 17th century and soon a full time grave carver was needed. While his identity is unknown, the earliest career carver in the Boston region carved from 1665 until the turn of the century and had the names of "The Old Stone Cutter", “The Charlestown Master” and "The Old Stone Cutter of Charlestown"”. Two of his known apprentices, William Mumford and Joseph Lamson later went on to become very successful carvers in the region.

Through probate documentation, newspaper announcements and inscripted signatures, researches have been able to associate more carvers behind particular headstones with identifiable historical people. Although some 300 individual carvers working in New England have been identified, not much is known about the majority of them, with some exceptions including John Lamson of Ipswich, Gershom Bartlett of Bolton, William Mumford of Boston, Josiah Manning and his sons Fredrick and Rockwell of Windham, John Zuricher of Manhattan, the James Foster family of Dorchester, The Stevens Family of Newport, and Nathaniel Holmes (active c. 1805) of Plymouth among others.

By the mid 18th century, stone-carving had become an independent industry, with its own system of apprenticeships and workshops. Although not considered a fine art, the craft required large amounts of skill and knowledge, including selecting stones from rock outcroppings, shaping them, preparing their faces and carving the reliefs. Different schools of carving emerged in different regions of New England, The John Stevens Shop based in Newport soon grew in popularity and soon was competing with new Rhode Island based carvers such as Gabriel Allen and Charles Hartshorn both based out of Providence Rhode Island all carving out of locally sourced slate.  The Connecticut River valley was prized for its brownstone quarries which were often used by the regions grave carvers.  Portland, Connecticut in particular had one of the largest brownstone quarries and many carvers were based from the region due to the ample supply of material. Carving families such as the Stanclift Family and Thomas Johnson Family would emerge with generations of tradesmen perfecting the art of carving from the soft and malleable stone.  Brownstone was prized due to its manipulative properties making it easier to carve elaborate designs when compared to Granite Schist or Slate, though ironically these characteristics made the stone prone to worse weathering and erosion than the latter materials.

Flat, tablet shaped stones made from slate was the preferred medium until marble became fashionable in the early 19th century. Early puritan era carvers were especially preoccupied by economy of line, geometric shapes and, at times abstract patterns. They show an unstyled "primitive" approach that tended towards simplicity and naturalism. As the approach is not detectable in later American art, the historian Allan Ludwig described it as a "half-finished experiment in form making. Its place...must therefore be described as one of quiet isolation. Nothing of the older tradition remained after 1815 but the silence of a forgotten epoch."

Attitudes towards death

Although modern society sharply avoids the reality of everyday disposal of its communities' dead, in puritan society these were common facts of life. Thus, their art reflects a pragmatic approach, embracing realistic imagery that evokes human decay into skulls and bones. Their use of simplistic, line drawn imagery was a deliberate rejection of Catholic iconography, a choice also reflected in the design of their churches, portrait paintings and stained glass. However, in a society that largely rejected visual art as idolatry, images created for funeral rites and headstones themselves were among the few artworks most people in this period would be were exposed to.

Puritan grave art reflects a deliberate move away from the European High Baroque type. Because its first generation craftsmen developed their craft isolated in the new word, as self taught, their works can be described as folk style, expressed in a vernacular style. In this their output reflects a general move towards a more vernacular and direct mode of expression, but practically, the style allowed the production of  a far greater number of stylized headstones by removing the need for the carvers having deep workshop experience. Although the New England style was heavily influenced by contemporary or slightly earlier trends in rural England and Scotland, this was more in terms of iconography and symbols than style. New England art of the time avoided Biblical allegories and depictions of the Christian cross.

.
Late 19th century academics tended to view older graveyards as basically museums, that were, as the historian Richard Meyer observed, viewed as distant "outdoor, spatially delineated repositories of cultural artifacts". Modern historians view them as valuable artifacts which provide a unique key to understanding the thoughts and beliefs of the people buried within the graves. Expanding on this thought, the historian Terry G. Jordan said that, given the artifact's density and state of preservation in New England, "nowhere else [in America] is it possible to look so deeply into our people's past". Meyer's takes this further, writing that the grave art of this period "exhibit patterns of change over temporal spans...and...can in many instances yield valuable cultural insights to a number of discrete time periods, including the present." Following Forbes work, researchers applied social sciences techniques in interpretation.

In 1983, the cultural historian James Hijiya raised concerns on the prevailing academic approach and methodology, and noted how the early carvers left no account record of their intentions, and so their motives cannot be easily interpreted, and observed that there is no remaining instance of any articulated evidence which indicates even "their outlook on life and death." Although a significant scholar in the field, Hijiya urges that reading into the meaning of any stone has to consider "information extraneous to the stones themselves" such as "writings produced at the same time as the carvings, though by different hands [and] aesthetic or anthropological theory which purports to illuminate human behavior at any time". Hijiya suggested an approach similar to the art historian Erwin Panofsky, that there is no reason to assume that any decoration is "uniquely determined."

Style
In contrast to contemporary US headstones, the remaining early Puritan examples are low sized and wide. They were typically capped with a rounded tympanum resembling the semi-circular half stones often found above the main doorway entrances into churches. The tympanum thus has symbolic meaning, reflecting the belief that through death, the soul moves from one world into the next. The theologian and minister William Perkins wrote that death was "a little wicket or doore whereby we passe out of this world and enter into heaven." This belief is also evident in some of the inscriptions, where the date of death is prefaced by terms such as "translated" or "exchanged" rather than "died". The phrase "Here Lies the Body" (or "Here lyes Buried the Body") makes this more explicit, implying that while the remains are present in the ground below, the soul has gone elsewhere.

Hijiya divides Northeastern American gravestones into six broad and overlapping styles reflective of "six different attitudes toward death". Of these, the first three are strictly "puritan", before the style softened into Unitarianism and Methodism imagery. The six styles as described by Hijiya are:

 "Plain Style" (1640–1710): Resignation
 "Death's Head" (1670–1770): Awe
 "Cherubs" / "Angels" (1740–1820): Confidence
 "Urn and Willow" (1780–1850): Mourning
 "Monumentalism" (1840–1920): Defiance
 "Modern Plain Style" (1900–2001): Ignorance

Plain Style
The first generation of settlers did not utilize communal burial grounds, and instead buried their dead on the highest point on their property, with individual graves marked with wooden slabs or field-stones. The earliest New England Puritan burying grounds date from the 1630s, and were, according to writer Meg Greene, "simply places to deposit the remains of the dead". In adherence to the second biblical commandment, "Thou shalt not make unto thee any graven image", the earliest settlers sought to avoid the worship of ancestors through stone images. In addition they sought to avoid use of the traditional Catholic cross, while table type tombs were seen as too elaborate, practically and aesthetically. The graves had little order to their plotting, and were either unmarked, or were marked a by wooden sign or an uncut rock, with only very few having a simple greenstone or carved headstone, usually with no decorations or ornamentation.

The earliest known stonecutters who carved gravestones in New England were George Griswold and his uncle Matthew who settled in Windsor, Connecticut around 1640.  Matthew carved the oldest known grave marker in the New World, a table tomb monument made of Windsor brownstone for the Rev. Ephriam Huit dated 1644 which stands in the Palisado Cemetery in Windsor today.  Both Matthew and George Griswold would continue carving both walled tomb style markers, and normal headstones until the end of the 17th century. When inscriptions began to be used, they are at first brief, factual and typically carved with "interruptive punctuation", that is an interpunct (raised period), between each word. Full names, kinship, age at death and the year of death are given, while the dating of placement of the stone itself is also present; typically they were commissioned and erected within a year of the burial.

The headstones had become increasingly elaborate the mid-17th century, and is characterized by stonework imagery describing the nature and frequency of death in dark, bleak and often bitter imagery. Soon after, a significant number contain epitaphs, the tone of which is often correlated with the severity or bleakness of the design. In 1980, the historian Peter Benes described the imagery in a Plymouth County graveyard as containing "menacing stares, impish smiles, and enigmatic facial contortions combine with totally abstract effigies to stop the modern viewer in his tracks, while revealing little of their significance".

The Plain Style is characterized by smaller headstone markers with unornamented, and bluntly factual inscriptions. It begins in the very early Colonial period, and lasts until roughly the first decade of the Eighteenth century. In most scholarly overviews, the amateurish carvings are attributed to a lack of tools and know-how on the part of the very early practitioners, who did have access to more experienced stonemasons. This explains in part why it remained in some areas later than others; with craftsmen in some areas developing their skills quicker than in others. A further reason may be that the early puritans, due to their feelings on humility and lack of regard for adornments, deliberately kept their headstones simple and minimalist. Hijiya goes on to say that the lack of decoration may have reflected that they viewed death as simply as an "ordinary, unremarkable aspect of the human condition", absent from any notion of either oblivion or passing on to ethereal life.

Death's head

The death's head is the earliest and most frequently occurring motif in colonial era American headstones. The head usually is winged, and accompanied by imagery such as hourglasses, bones and coffins. Though seemingly frightening to modern viewers, the image of a skull was then less about inspiring dread in the viewer, and more about acknowledging a normal, everyday fact of human life. In their belief system, death was when the flesh passed away to make way for renewal in the afterlife. The skulls reflect puritan funeral rituals in total, including their approach to elegies, funerals rites and sermons. Commonly, the horses carrying the remains of the deceased to the graveyard were draped with robes containing painted coffins and death's heads. Burial usually took place three to eight days after death, with the headstone erected up to eight months later.

Before the English colonies were fully established and had fully functioning ecomomies, burial rituals were expensive; a relatively elaborate funeral in Boston in the 1720s would have cost around £100. The headstones were a relatively small part of the overall expense, in the 1720s they ranged from £2 to over £40.

By the mid-18th century, the death's head image sometimes became less stern and menacing. The figure was often crowned, the lower jaw eliminated, and serrations of teeth appeared on the upper row. Particularly, the eyes become more animated, sometimes almond shaped and with pupils, gibing it a more soul than deathlike appearance.  Death's head designs started becoming less common by the 1780s and died out around 1805.

Extra imagery such as foliage, grapes and vines, and hearts suggest new life through sacraments and resurrection. This transition cannot be clearly, or easily, seen through the gravestones. The changes are very minute and gradual leaving some stones with a disturbing image in between an empty skull and a lively soul.  Other motifs from this era include imps of death depicted as small evil demons bearing the arrows of death. They are particularly associated with the Charlestown grave carver Joseph Lamson, who carved imps either pallbearing or adorned with imagery of death and decay such as scythes and hourglasses.

Cherubs

Continuing the evolution of winged death heads, cherubs (or "soul effigies") are skull shaped effigies with distinctly human faces, that are intended to  represent the soul of the deceased. Some are placed in an enclosing motif, such as a solar symbol or a tree. Others retain the angels wings commonly seen in the death head.

The use of cherubs rather than death's heads only became commonplace in the Boston area in the mid-18th century, and was more commonly found in southern rather than northern parts of New England like Rhode Island and Connecticut where the majority of headstone designs from the beginning of the 18th century were of Cherub or Winged Soul effigies. Some of the cherubs have individualized faces, and may contain elements of portraiture. In Eastern Massachusetts, those on headstones marking male graves tend to have hair shown with a downwards curl, while those marking female graves show an upwards curl.

The inclusion of Boston Region cherubs mostly dates from the mid 18th century until around 1810, and has a direct lineage to earlier funerary art, often showing a living human arched by wings.  The John Stevens Shop of Newport began using Cherub effigies as early as 1705, and carvers in the Merrimack Valley region were using soul/cherub designs starting in the 1680s.  One such carver, John Hartshorne of Rowley, Massachusetts began carving graves around 1680 in the region, until around 1710 when he moved to Franklin, Connecticut and continued carving until his death in 1737, thus introducing the cherub design to the region.  Soon carvers such as Obadiah Wheeler of Lebanon and Benjamin Collins of Columbia began adopting soul effigies and other designs inspired by Hartshorne's work. This is just one example of how regional designs spread among carvers during the colonial era.

Urn and Willow

The rise of secularism during the Federalist Era, roughly lasting from 1790 to 1820, saw the prominence of urn and willow in headstone imagery. During this period, the imagery turned even more away from English influences, in favor of Neoclassicism and Greek Revival style. So began the decline in Puritan influence. During the first two decades of the 19th century, elaborate borders on headstones were rapidly replaced by simple lines and sometimes abstract designs. Often borders resembling pillars were used, further exemplifying the neoclassical influence during this time.  Along with Urns and Willows, sometimes designs featuring sunsets were used instead, particularly by Rhode Island stonecutters.

Monumentalism and Modern Plain Style
By the early 19th century, as social classes emerged and became more important, graveyards lost their earlier egalitarian uniformity and simplicity; up until that point all headstones were of similar size and plots were grouped together. Plots in certain areas of existing graveyards became more expensive as a marked difference emerged between cemeteries in well off as compared to less affluent areas. The graveyards of the former tended towards grandiosity and monumentalism, while the latter are characterized by crowded rows of simple headstones.

The change was especially seen from the 1840s, when a trend towards integrating nature and landscape emerged, leading to the use of obelisks, columns, and statues, while the use of slate, brownstone and schist was largely phased out in favor of marble, In addition, disease and odor concerns in urbanized areas pushed graveyards toward the outskirts of towns and cities, no longer an integral part of the central landscape. It is at this point that the Puritan traditions in funerary art end.

The historian Karen Wenhworth Batignani describes New England headstones from 1900 as "far less interesting than their predecessors. Polished granite blocks that offer names and dates but few clues as to who the deceased were." She, like other historians, attribute this is a culture of denial of death, in which large sums of money are spent on "steel lined, gorgeously cushioned caskets [and] air conditioned tombs".

Inscriptions

Epitaphs
Epitaphs become common from the later 17th century. From these, it becomes possible to tell something of the attitudes and outlook of both the masons and the deceased. They often take the format of memento moris:

These early examples reflect the pessimistic puritan outlook of the time, in that they do not mention an afterlife or the resurrection of the dead, and thie text often include imagery of worms, decay and dust. It is only on the much later cherub stones that more personalized goodbyes to loved ones, or mention of an afterlife, begin to appear:

Study
Serious academic study of early puritan funerary art is a relatively new field. The historian and photographer Harriette Forbes, working with the historian Ernest Caulfield in Massachusetts during the 1920s, was the first to study the subject and amassed the first significant library of photographs and an expansive catalog of 16th century graves. Her book Gravestones of Early New England and the Men Who Made Them, 1653-1800 classified and interpret the artifacts in the context of the dominant religious and cultural influences of their times. The influential puritan minister, author, and pamphleteer Cotton Mather observed in 1693 how "the stones in this wilderness are already grown so witty as to speak".

Modern scholars take a more circumspect view, in that most of the early carvers were often amateurs, and although they had basic understandings of iconography, their style and language evolved in a setting cut off from European trends, or a coherent, internal, written discourse. The historian Richard Meyer largely agrees with Mather's claim, and notes how the path of study of these early graveyards understood that such artifacts, "through a variety of complex and often interrelated manifestations, establish patterns of communication (and even dynamic interaction) with those who use or view them".

The next major publication was Allen Ludwig's 1966 book Graven Images: New England Stone Carving and its Symbols, 1650-1815, although it tended to focus on describing specific examples, rather than present broad overviews or analysis.

Reflecting the density of surviving examples, in 2006, the art historian James Blachowicz produced a catalog of 8000 stones and 713 individual burial grounds. He lists some 1300 stones that are signed or have been documented, and made a significant contribution to the methodology used to attribute headstones to individual carvers. In particular he identified 60 sets of typefaces, provided a detailed overview of how styles of representing letters, numbers and symbols could be used to group headstones by their carvers.

Footnotes

References

Citations

Sources

 Benes, Peter; Montague Benes; Jane. Puritan Gravestone Art II. Boston, MA: Boston University, 1978
 Dethlefsen, Edwin; Deetz, James. "Death's Heads, Cherubs, and Willow Trees: Experimental Archaeology in Colonial Cemeteries", American Antiquity, 1966. pp. 502–510
 Eriquez, Christina. Our History In Stone: The New England Cemetery Dictionary. lulu, 2010. 
 Garvan, Anthony. "The New England Plain Style". Comparative Studies in Society and History, volume 3, no. 1, 1960. 
 Gilson, William. "Stone Faces". New England Review, Vol. 30, No. 4, 2009/2010. 
 Greene, Meg. Rest in Peace: A History of American Cemeteries . CT: Twenty-First Century Books, 2007. 
 Hijiya, James. "American Gravestones and Attitudes Toward Death: A Brief History". Proceedings of the American Philosophical Society, vol. 127, No. 5 (Oct. 14, 1983). 
 Ludwig, Allen. Graven Images: New England Stone Carving and its Symbols, 1650-1815. CT: Wesleyan University Press, 2000. 
 Merrifield Forbes, Harriette . Gravestones of Early New England and the Men Who Made Them, 1653-1800. Pyne Press, 1973. 
 Meyer, Richard. Cemeteries and Gravemarkers: Voices of American Culture. MI: Umi Research Press, 1989. 
 Neal, Avon. "gRAVEN iMAGES: Sermons in Stones". Americal Heritage, Volume XXI, no. 5, August 1970
 Prioli, Carmine. "Review: Early New England Gravestone Scholarship". Early American Literature, Volume 14, no. 3, Winter, 1979/1980
 Roark, Elisabeth. Artists of Colonial America. Westport, CT: Greenwood Press, 2003. 
 Tashjian, Dickran; Tashjian, Ann. Memorials for Children of Change: The Art of Early New England Gravestone Carving. Wesleyan, 1974. 
 Yal-om, Marilyn. The American Resting Place: 400 Years of History Through Our Cemeteries and Burial Grounds. Houghton Mifflin Harcourt, 2008. 
 Wenhworth Batignani, Karen. Maine's Coastal Cemeteries. Lanham MD: Down East Books, 2003. 
 Wood, Mary Catherine. "Book Review: James Blachowicz. From Slate to Marble: Gravestone Carving Traditions in Eastern Massachusetts, 1770–1870". Winterthur Portfolio 42, no. 4, Winter 2008

External links
 Iconography of Gravestones at Burying Grounds, Boston City Hall

American sculpture
Cemetery art
Funerary art
New England Puritanism
Outdoor sculptures in the United States
Skulls in art